Afeez Awakan born (22 June 1993) is a first-team player of Dakkada FC. 
He is a utility player who can play as a defensive midfielder and winger.

Personal life
Awakan is a native of Ogun, Nigeria.

Club career

Awakan started his football career at FC Ebiede in 2011.
 
He made a name for himself while playing for Akwa United. On 15 November 2015, Awakan scored the only goal against Lobi Stars in the final matchday of the 2014–15 season, at the Nest of Champions to help Akwa United maintain their top-flight status.

On 22 November 2015, Awakan won the Nigeria FA Cup with Akwa United. His goal alongside Namdo Edo's strike earned the Uyo club a 2–1 win over Lobi Stars in the final at Teslim Balogun Stadium.

Awakan was voted Most Valuable Player of the tournament.

Awakan moved to Enugu Rangers from Akwa United alongside Fortune Omoniwari at the beginning of the 2016–17 season.

He is currently at Dakkada for the 2020-21 NPFL season

Club honours
Nigerian FA Cup
Federation Cup 2015 with Akwa United

Individual honours
Most Valuable Player
Federation Cup 2015

References
8. https://www.flashscore.com.ng/player/awakan-abdulafeez/GK3hkOfH/

External links
- "2015 Nigeria FA Cup Final" - Abdulazeez Awakan Match Highlights Adevou Kokou Youtube Channel

.

Living people
1993 births
Association football wingers
Nigerian footballers
Nigeria Professional Football League players
Dakkada F.C. players